Mike Wylie (born in Penrith, New South Wales) is an Australian former professional rugby league footballer who played one first grade match for the Penrith Panthers in the 1968 New South Wales Rugby League premiership competition.

Wylie is Panther number 42.

Sources
 Whiticker, Alan & Hudson, Glen (2006) The Encyclopedia of Rugby League Players, Gavin Allen Publishing, Sydney

References

Year of birth missing (living people)
Living people
Australian rugby league players
Rugby league players from Penrith, New South Wales
Penrith Panthers players